Breweries in Arkansas produce a wide range of beers in different styles that are marketed locally, regionally, and nationally. In 2012 Arkansas' 14 breweries, importers, brewpubs, and company-owned packagers and wholesalers employed 100 people directly, and another 6,000 in related jobs such as wholesaling and retailing. Including people directly employed in brewing, as well as those who supply Arkansas' breweries with everything from ingredients to machinery, the total business and personal tax revenue generated by Arkansas' breweries and related industries was more than $129 million. Consumer purchases of Arkansas' brewery products generated another $68 million in tax revenue. In 2012, according to the Brewers Association, Arkansas ranked 41st in per capita craft breweries with 10.

For context, at the end of 2013 there were 2,822 breweries in the United States, including 2,768 craft breweries subdivided into 1,237 brewpubs, 1,412 microbreweries and 119 regional craft breweries. In that same year, according to the Beer Institute, the brewing industry employed around 43,000 Americans in brewing and distribution and had a combined economic impact of more than $246 billion.

Breweries

Amity 

 Slate Rock Brewing

Bentonville
 Bentonville Brewing Company
 Bike Rack Brewing Company

Big Flat 

 Gravity Brewworks

Camden 

 Native Dog Brewing Company

El Dorado 

 Three Birds Brewing Company

Eureka Springs 

 Eureka Springs Brewery
 Gotahold

Fayetteville
 Apple Blossom Brewing Company
Boston Mountain Brewing
Columbus House Brewery 
Crisis Brewing 
 Fossil Cove Brewing Company
 West Mountain Brewing Company

Fort Smith
 Fort Smith Brewing Company

Harrison 

 Brick & Forge Brew Works

Hot Springs 
 SQZBX Brewery & Pizza Joint
Superior Bathhouse Brewery

Jacksonville 

 Blade and Barrel Brewing Company

Jonesboro 

 Native Brew Works

Little Rock
 Diamond Bear Brewing Company
 Flyway Brewing Co
 Lost 40 Brewing
 Stone's Throw Brewing
 Vino's Brewpub

Norfork 

 Norfork Brewing Co.

Paris 
Prestonrose Farm and Brewing Co.

Rogers
 Ozark Beer Company
New Province Brewing Company

Scranton 

 Pridgin Family Brewing

Siloam Springs 

 Ivory Bill Brewing Co.

Springdale
 Core Brewing and Distilling Company
Hawk Moth Brewery & Beer Parlor
 Saddlebock Brewery

Subiaco 

 Country Monks Brewing

Former Breweries 

 Blue Canoe Brewing Co.
 Buffalo Brewing Company
 Damgoode Pies Brewpub
East Sixth Brewing Co.
 Rebel Kettle Brewing Co
 Refined Ale Brewery

See also 
 Beer in the United States
 List of breweries in the United States
 List of microbreweries

References

Arkansas
Breweries